My Wedding and Other Secrets is a 2011 romantic comedy film directed by Roseanne Liang, written by Liang and Angeline Loo, and produced by South Pacific Pictures. The film is based on Liang's real-life cross-cultural romance.

Plot

A Romeo and Juliet story set in Auckland, New Zealand, Emily Chu (Michelle Ang) is the daughter of traditional Chinese parents, whose only wishes are that she marries a good Chinese boy and becomes a doctor. But life seems to have other ideas for Emily, who dreams of becoming a world-famous director and falls in love with a white boy from university, James Harrison (Matt Whelan).

When she and James, two kindred nerd spirits fall clumsily into love they must overcome the expectations of her parents. A Kiwi-Asian, Emily considers herself a banana (yellow on the outside, white on the inside), but her father Dr Chu has a different perspective, and his past threats of disownment on her sister hangs over Emily's head. With their secret marriage, Emily's documentary, and James' ultimatum to learn Mandarin or lose Emily, life suddenly becomes very busy for the young pair.

Emily is faced with the difficult decision of having to choose between long-suffering James and her parents who have made countless sacrifices to bring their family to New Zealand. It seems Emily must learn the hard way that love and family require sacrifice and not everybody can be happy.

Themes
Significant themes in My Wedding and Other Secrets are those of cultural differences between migrant parents and their native-born children, of filial piety, and of love.

Cast 

The choice to cast Kenneth Tsang and Cheng Pei-pei, as opposed to Australian Chinese and New Zealand Chinese actors and actresses, was intentional. On this decision, Roseanne Liang said, "What I wanted above all was authenticity", with her adding that, "All of the New Zealand and Australian Chinese actors were Chinese people who had grown up in New Zealand or Australia. I wanted actors who could speak Hong Kong-accented Cantonese as well as Cantonese-accented English". However, middle Chu daughter, Melanie Chu, is portrayed by United Kingdom-based New Zealand Chinese actress Celeste Wong.

Production

Development
Roseanne Liang sought to produce My Wedding and Other Secrets, originally titled Girl Meets Boy, a film based on her award-winning 2005 documentary Banana in a Nutshell, and entered into negotiations with South Pacific Pictures.

Filming for My Wedding and Other Secrets commenced on 14 February 2010 in Auckland.

Writing
Auckland-based Chinese New Zealander director and playwright Roseanne Liang and Angeline Loo, a friend of Liang's from university days, wrote the script, largely based on her life, for My Wedding and Other Secrets over four years. The character of Emily is based on Roseanne herself; James is based on Stephen Harris, Liang's boyfriend and later husband; and Dr. and Mrs. Chu and their daughters, Susan and Melanie, after Dr. and Mrs. Liang and their daughters, Renee and Rhea.

Liang was born in New Zealand and, like her character, was set to attend medical school and become a doctor; but, after realising her passion in film and others realising this too, attended University of Auckland, graduating with a Bachelor of Arts (B.A.) in Film/TV/Media Studies and a Bachelor of Science (BSc) in Computer Science and, later, a Master of Creative and Performing Arts (M.C.P.A.), concentrating in screen writing and directing.

Many of the events depicted in the film are also based on events that occurred during Liang and Harris' courtship, including Harris' learning basic Mandarin to win over Liang's parents' approval, as part of Chinese pre-wedding customs.

Music
The following songs are featured in the film:
Bic Runga — "Hello, Hello"
Bic Runga — "Mama Hao (媽媽好, Mama's the Best)"
Bic Runga — "Say After Me"
Bic Runga — "This Girl's Prepared for War"
Esther Mitchell — "Shining Star"
Johnny Barker — "Spiderman's Secret"
K Nielson — "The Inhaler Song"
Thrill Kill — "The Cad"
Xiang Lan Li — "Mei Hua (Plum Blossom)"

Reception

Critical reception
My Wedding and Other Secrets received positive reviews from major publications in New Zealand.

Peter Calder of the New Zealand Herald gave the film a five-star review, calling it "utterly charming" and the writing "The logical extension of the idea into a feature film has turned out a cracker - a heartfelt and mildly goofy comedy with a strong thread of pathos that tells a story we should all listen to".

Christine Powley of the Otago Daily Times also gave a five-star review and recommended viewers to "See it with your girlfriends for a nice time, then sneak back by yourself to enjoy just how well-crafted it is".

Richard Kuipers of Variety gave a favourable review, adding "Liang's brisk and breezy direction is complemented by Richard Harling's appropriately simple and effective lensing around Auckland. Snippets of Liang's Super 8 homemovies are delightful. Other technical work is solid on a modest budget".

Awards

Melbourne International Film Festival 2011
Asian American International Film Festival 2011 - winner Audience Choice award
Feel Good Film Festival 2011
Singafest Asian Film Festival (L.A.) 2011 
Friars Club Comedy Film Festival (N.Y.) 2011 - winner Audience Choice Award
Hawaii International Film Festival 2011
China Golden Rooster & Hundred Flowers Festival 2011
San Diego Asian Film Festival 2011
Australia New Zealand Film Festival (Singapore) 2011 
Aotearoa Film & Television Awards (NZ) 2011 – winner Best Screenplay (Roseanne Liang & Angeline Loo); winner Best Actress (Michelle Ang)
Brussels Independent Film Festival 2011
International Film Festival of India 2011
San Joaquin International Film Festival 2012
Chinese New Year Film Festival Auckland University (NZ) Feb 2012
San Francisco International Asian American Film Festival 2012
National Geographic All Roads Film Festival 2012
New York Festivals International Film & Television Awards 2012 - Bronze World Medal for Feature Film                                                                                                                           
Newport Beach International Film Festival 2012
Lighthouse International Film Festival (N.J, USA) 2012
Prescott Film Festival (AZ, USA) 2012
Warburton Film Festival 2012
International Film Festival of Fiji 2012

References

External links

Synopsis - My Wedding and Other Secrets
My Wedding and Other Secrets - NZ on Screen

2011 romantic comedy films
2011 films
2010s Cantonese-language films
Chinese-New Zealand culture
Films about families
Films about weddings
Films set in Auckland
Films shot in New Zealand
New Zealand independent films
Films about interracial romance
New Zealand coming-of-age films
New Zealand romantic comedy films
2010s English-language films
2010s Mandarin-language films
2011 multilingual films
New Zealand multilingual films
2011 independent films